The 2007 NBA Development League draft was held on November 1, 2007 at 8PM. There were ten rounds.

Rounds

References

NBA G League draft
draft
National Basketball Development League draft